Brutality Will Prevail (sometimes abbreviated BWP) were a Welsh hardcore band founded in Cardiff in 2005. They have toured Europe and Asia and have made festival appearances at Reading and Leeds, Download and Ghostfest. They have also been covered in magazines such as the NME and Kerrang!.

History 
The band was formed in 2005 by guitarist James Goodman and drummer Adam Evans, the lineup was completed by bassist Dale Williams and vocalist Gareth Arnold. With this lineup they played shows in the South Wales area and recorded the Life Is Our War EP. This lineup lasted the rest of the year and then members left for various reasons.

2006 saw Goodman link up with new vocalist Ajay Jones who would become the face of the band for the next eight years. He also brought bassist Emlyn Lamb into the fold and with this lineup they recorded the Never Turn Back EP and started making a name for themselves nationwide touring with bands such as Baysix. Further lineup changes saw Evans being replaced on drums by Richard Dyas and the addition of Jordan Murray on second guitar. With this lineup they recorded the rare South Wales Kings EP and continued to make a name for themselves on the UK scene. They remained quiet until 2008 when Nick Rix joined the band and push it to a darker side of hardcore releasing the Forgotten Soul record on Purgatory Records. Marc Richards would then replace Richard Dyas on drum duties and him and Rix worked forward towards the release of The Root Of All Evil in 2010 and Scatter The Ashes in 2012. The band supported the releases by touring extensively around the UK, gaining a reputation due to their intense performance and the tightness and got themselves places at many festivals (including headlining the Red Bull Stage at Hevy Fest 2012), and touring with bands including  The Acacia Strain, Cancer Bats and Terror.

Vocalist departure, change and new album 
In 2012, it was announced that Ajay Jones had left the band, who justified this due to the increasing time pressure of the musician and his interests outside the band. Louis Gauthier having already filled in on tour duties replaced Jones and joined the band. The band toured all over the world making their mark; appearing at bigger festivals such as Reading and Leeds, Download, Brutal Assault etc.

In early 2017, they released the album In Dark Places, which took a much darker and somber tone to previous releases, ditching the faster and aggressive hardcore style they had before, for a doomy more groove oriented sound but still managing to keep the recognizable hardcore tone they were known for.

Discography 
Studio albums
 Forgotten Soul (2009)
 Root of All Evil (2010)
 Scatter the Ashes (2012)
 Suspension of Consciousness (2014)
 In Dark Places (2017)
 Misery Sequence (2019)

EPs
 Life Is Our War (2005)
 Never Turn Back (2006)
 South Wales Kings (2007)
 Split with Hang the Bastard (2010)
 Sleep Paralysis (2011)
 Split with Ark of the Covenant (2011)

References

British hardcore punk groups
Sludge metal musical groups
Welsh punk rock groups
Welsh heavy metal musical groups
Musical groups from Cardiff
2005 establishments in Wales
Musical groups established in 2005
Musical quartets